Benjamin Holt Ticknor (January 9, 1909 – September 12, 1979) was an American college football player. He was a prominent center for the Harvard Crimson, known especially for his play on defense. He was captain of the 1930 team. Harvard did not see its success of old during Ticknor's era, but he relished the beatings of rival Yale. Ticknor was elected to the College Football Hall of Fame in 1954. 

Ticknor was the son of William Davis Ticknor Sr. (1881–1938) and Ella Frances Wattles (1880–1963). His grandfather was another Benjamin Holt Ticknor and his great-grandfather another William Davis Ticknor of Ticknor and Fields.

References

External links
 
 

1909 births
1979 deaths
American football centers
Harvard Crimson football players
All-American college football players
College Football Hall of Fame inductees
Milton Academy alumni
People from Canton, Massachusetts
Players of American football from Massachusetts
Burials at Mount Auburn Cemetery